The 1976–77 Yugoslav Ice Hockey League season was the 35th season of the Yugoslav Ice Hockey League, the top level of ice hockey in Yugoslavia. 14 teams participated in the league, and Jesenice have won the championship.

Regular season

Group A

Group B

Group C

External links
Season on hrhockey 

Yugoslav
Yugoslav Ice Hockey League seasons
1976–77 in Yugoslav ice hockey